Pla d'Adet or Saint-Lary 1700 is a ski resort in the French Pyrenees, in the department of Hautes-Pyrénées, and the region Midi-Pyrénées. The climb to the ski station is frequently used as a stage finish in the Tour de France cycle race.

Skiing infrastructure

Ski area
55 ski slopes
30 lifts

Cycle racing

Details of the climb
The climb to the ski station starts at Vignec, on the outskirts of Saint-Lary-Soulan. Over this distance, the climb gains  in altitude, at an average gradient of 8%, with several sections near the start of the climb in excess of 12%.

The bottom section of the climb (4.6km) were used for the downhill Red Bull Road Rage race held on 12 September 2009. The race was won by Tour de France multiple stage winner and former yellow jersey wearer, Frédéric Moncassin.

Tour de France
The Tour de France has featured Pla d'Adet as a finish on 10 occasions since 1974, most recently in 2014.

The beginning of the climb also has featured as the access road to the col de Portet, which deviates from the main road taking a right turn at Espiaube.

References

Ski areas and resorts in France
Hautes-Pyrénées